was a Japanese girl who became a victim of the atomic bombings of Hiroshima and Nagasaki by the United States. She was two years of age when the bombs were dropped and was severely irradiated. She survived for another ten years, becoming one of the most widely known hibakusha—a Japanese term meaning "bomb-affected person". She is remembered through the story of the more than one thousand origami cranes she folded before her death. She died at the age of 12 on October 25, 1955 at the Hiroshima Red Cross Hospital.

Event
She was blown out of the window and her mother ran out to find her, suspecting she may be dead, but instead finding her two-year-old daughter alive with no apparent injuries. While they were fleeing, Sadako and her mother were caught in black rain. Her grandmother ran back inside and died near the house, apparently trying to escape fires by hiding in a cistern.

Aftermath
Sadako grew up like her peers and became an important member of her class relay team. In November 1954, Sadako developed swellings on her neck and behind her ears. In January 1955, purpura had formed on her legs. Subsequently, she was diagnosed with acute malignant lymph gland leukemia (her mother and others in Hiroshima referred to it as "atomic bomb disease"). She was hospitalized on February 21, 1955, and given no more than a year to live.

Several years after the atomic explosion an increase in leukemia was observed, especially among children. By the early 1950s, it was clear that the leukemia was caused by radiation exposure by the uranium in the bomb.

She was admitted as a patient to the Hiroshima Red Cross Hospital for treatment and given blood transfusions on February 21, 1955. By the time she was admitted, her white blood cell count was six times higher than the average child's levels.

Origami cranes
In August 1955, she was moved into a room with a girl named Kiyo, a junior high school student who was two years older than her. Shortly after, cranes were brought to her room from a local high school club. Sasaki's friend, Chizuko Hamamoto, told her the legend of the cranes and she set herself a goal of folding 1,000 of them, which was believed to grant the folder a wish. Although she had plenty of free time during her days in the hospital, Sasaki lacked paper, so she used medicine wrappings and whatever else she could scrounge; including going to other patients' rooms to ask for the paper from their get-well presents. Her best friend, Chizuko, also brought paper from school for Sasaki to use.

A popular version of the story is that Sasaki fell short of her goal of folding 1,000 cranes, having folded only 644 before her death and that her friends completed the 1,000 and buried them all with her. (This comes from the novelized version of her life Sadako and the Thousand Paper Cranes.) However, an exhibit that appeared in the Hiroshima Peace Memorial Museum stated that by the end of August 1955, Sasaki had achieved her goal and continued to fold 300 more cranes. Sadako's older brother, Masahiro Sasaki, says in his book The Complete Story of Sadako Sasaki that she exceeded her goal.

Death

During her time in the hospital, her condition progressively worsened. Around mid-October 1955, her left leg became swollen and turned purple. After her family urged her to eat something, Sadako requested tea on rice and remarked "It's tasty". She then thanked her family, those being her last words. With her family and friends around her, Sadako died on the morning of October 25, 1955, at the age of 12.

After her death, Sadako's body was examined by the Atomic Bomb Casualty Commission (ABCC) for research on the effects of the atomic bomb on the human body before Sadako was cremated.

Memorials
After her death, Sasaki's friends and schoolmates published a collection of letters in order to raise funds to build a memorial to her and all of the children who had died from the effects of the atomic bomb, including another Japanese girl Yoko Moriwaki. In 1958, a statue of Sasaki holding a golden crane was unveiled in the Hiroshima Peace Memorial Park. At the foot of the statue is a plaque that reads: "This is our cry. This is our prayer. Peace in the world."

There is also a statue of her in the Seattle Peace Park. Sasaki has become a leading symbol of the effects of nuclear war and has become an international symbol for peace and a peaceful world, especially during the ongoing 2022 Russian invasion of Ukraine. Sasaki is also a heroine for many girls in Japan. Her story is told in some Japanese schools on the anniversary of the Hiroshima bombing. Dedicated to Sasaki, people all over Japan celebrate August 6 as the annual peace day.

Artist Sue DiCicco founded the Peace Crane Project in 2013 to celebrate Sadako's legacy and connect students around the world in a vision of peace. DiCicco and Sadako's brother co-wrote a book about Sadako, The Complete Story of Sadako Sasaki, hoping to bring her true story to English speaking countries. Their website offers a study guide for students and an opportunity to "Ask Masahiro".

In popular culture
The tragic death of Sadako Sasaki inspired Dagestani Russian poet Rasul Gamzatov, who had paid a visit to the city of Hiroshima, to write an Avar poem, "Zhuravli", which eventually became one of Russia's greatest war ballads. Sasaki's life and death are also the subject of the song "Cranes over Hiroshima" by American singer-songwriter Fred Small.

See also

 Children of Hiroshima
 The Day of the Bomb
 Hiroshima Maidens
 Hiroshima Witness
 Orizuru
 Sadako and the Thousand Paper Cranes

References

External links

 Sadako and the Paper Cranes —photos and other informational materials on the official homepage of the Hiroshima Peace Memorial Museum
 Sadako and the Atomic Bombing—Kids Peace Station at the Hiroshima Peace Memorial Museum
 Sadako Sasaki—The Complete Story of Sadako Sasaki website
 Senzaburu Orikata—a 1797 book of origami designs to be used in the folding of thousand-crane amulets.
 "Cranes over Hiroshima"—lyrics to a song by Fred Small inspired by Sadako Sasaki.
 Sadako and the Thousand Paper Cranes
 "Daughter of Samurai"—a song by Russian rock band Splean, inspired by Sadako Sasaki.
 "Sadako e le mille gru di carta" is an album by Italian progressive rock band LogoS; published in 2020, seventy-five years after atomic bombing of Hiroshima, it tells the story of Sadako Sasaki.

1943 births
1955 deaths
Anti–nuclear weapons movement
Children in war
Deaths from cancer in Japan
Deaths from leukemia
Hibakusha
Japanese children
Origami artists
People from Hiroshima
Child deaths